This is a timeline documenting events of Jazz in the year 1973.

Events

May
 23 – The very first Nattjazz started in Bergen, Norway (May 23 – June 6).

June
 9 – The 2nd Moers Festival started in Moers, Germany (June 9 – 11).
 29
 The 20th Newport Jazz Festival started in New York, New York for its second year there. (June 29 – July 8).
 The 7th Montreux Jazz Festival started in Montreux, Switzerland (June 29 – July 15).

September
 21 – The 16th Monterey Jazz Festival started in Monterey, California (September 21 – 23).

Album releases

Art Ensemble of Chicago: Fanfare For The Warriors
Gato Barbieri: Chapter One: Latin America
Paul Bley
Paul Bley & Scorpio
'Paul Bley/NHØPDollar BrandAfrican Portraits African Space ProgramSangomaMarion Brown: Geechee RecollectionsBetty Carter: Album (Betty Carter album)Don Cherry: Relativity SuiteBilly Cobham SpectrumCharles Earland: Charles III (album)Michael Franks: Michael FranksHal Galper: Inner JourneyHerbie HancockHead HuntersSextantKeith Jarrett: Solo Concerts: Bremen/LausanneRoland Kirk: Prepare Thyself To Deal With A MiracleDavid Liebman: First VisitFrank Lowe: Black BeingsMahavishnu OrchestraBirds of FireMichael Mantler: No AnswerPaul Motian: Conception VesselOregon: Distant HillsJoe Pass: Virtuoso (Joe Pass album)Oscar Peterson: The TrioFlora Purim: Butterfly DreamsDewey Redman: The Ear of the BehearerSam Rivers: StreamsRoswell Rudd: Numatik Swing BandSpontaneous Music Ensemble: MouthpieceJohn Surman: Morning GloryCecil Taylor: SoloCecil Taylor: Spring of Two Blue J'sRalph Towner: DiaryMcCoy Tyner: EnlightenmentMal Waldron: Up Popped the DevilWeather Report: SweetnighterEberhard Weber: The Colours of ChloëFrank Wright: Church Number Nine''

Deaths

 January
 2 – Joe Harriott, Jamaican saxophonist and composer (born 1928).
 3 – Wilbur de Paris, American trombonist and bandleader (born 1900).
 23 – Kid Ory,  American trombonist and bandleader(born 1886).

 February
 3 – Andy Razaf, African-American poet, composer, and lyricist (born 1895).
 19 – Leon Washington, American tenor saxophonist (leukemia) (born 1909).

 March
 2 – Spanky DeBrest, American upright bassist (born 1937).

 April
 18 – Willie "The Lion" Smith, American pianist (born 1897).

 May
 14 – Elmer Snowden, American banjo and guitar player (born 1900).
 24 – Sid Phillips, English clarinettist, bandleader, and arranger (born 1907).

 June
 8 – Tubby Hayes, English saxophonist and multi-instrumentalist (born 1935).

August
 4 – Eddie Condon, American banjoist, guitarist, and bandleader (born 1905).

 September
 20 – Ben Webster, American tenor saxophonist (born 1909).
 26 – Bernard Etté, German violinist and conductor (born 1898).

 October
 16 – Gene Krupa, American drummer, band leader, actor, and composer (born 1909).
 21 – Bill Harris, American trombonist (born 1916).

 December
 3 – Emile Christian, American trombonist (born 1895).

Births

 January
 4
 Bartlomiej Oles, Polish drummer, composer, and record producer.
 Marcin Oles, Polish bassist, composer and record producer.
 12 – Brian Culbertson, American keyboardist and trombonist.
 31 – Petr Kroutil, Czech clarinettist, saxophonist, bansuri player, vocalist, composer, and arranger.

 February
 3 – Timuçin Şahin, Turkish guitarist and composer.
 11 – Ethan Iverson, American pianist, composer, and critic.
 22 – Gustavo Assis-Brasil, Brazilian-American guitarist.

 March
 23 – Stefon Harris, American vibraphonist.

 April
 17 – Moses Taiwa Molelekwa, South African pianist (died 2001).
 30 – Frédéric Yonnet, French harmonica player and producer.

 May
 14 – Clare Teal, English singer.
 23 – Nikki Yeoh, British pianist and composer.
 24 – Hallgeir Pedersen, Norwegian guitarist and composer.

 June
 3 – Ebru Aydın, Turkish singer and songwriter.
 4
 Gunhild Seim, Norwegian trumpeter and composer.
 Scott Hammond, English drummer, Jethro Tull.

 July
 2 – Teodross Avery, American tenor saxophonist.
 8 – Magne Thormodsæter, Norwegian upright bassist and composer.
 21 – Susheela Raman, British-Indian singer and songwriter.

 August
 9 – Meg Okura, American violinist, ehru player, and composer.
 11 – Torbjørn Sletta Jacobsen, Norwegian saxophonist and composer.

 September
 3 – Norihiko Hibino, Japanese video game composer and saxophonist.
 4 – Wetle Holte, Norwegian drummer and composer.
 7 – Thomas T. Dahl, Norwegian guitarist and composer, Krøyt and Dingobats.
 9 – John Blackwell American drummer, Prince (died 2017).
 12 – Dorota Miśkiewicz, Polish singer, songwriter, composer, and violinist.
 21 – Fredrik Wallumrød, Norwegian drummer and composer.
 26
 Nelson Williams, American trumpeter.
 Nicholas Payton, American trumpeter and multi-instrumentalist.

 October
 3
 Eirik Hegdal, Norwegian saxophonist, composer, and arranger.
 Marius Reksjø, Norwegian upright bassist.

 November
 3 – Eivind Austad, Norwegian pianist, composer, and music teacher.

 December
 18 – Christian Jaksjø, Norwegian trombone and euphonium player.
 29 – Kalle Kalima, Finnish guitarist and composer.

 Unknown date
 Ben Castle, British clarinettist and saxophonist.
 Eivind Opsvik, Norwegian upright bassist and composer.
 Janne Mark, Danish vocalist and composer.
 Kate Dimbleby, English cabaret singer and songwriter.
 Maria Markesini, Greek singer and pianist.
 Özay Fecht, Turkish-German actress and singer.
 Titilayo Adedokun, Nigerian-American singer.

See also

 1970s in jazz
 List of years in jazz
 1973 in music

References

External links 
 History Of Jazz Timeline: 1973 at All About Jazz

Jazz
Jazz by year